Citrone/Buhl Autosport is an American racing team, currently competing in the NTT IndyCar Series with Rahal Letterman Lanigan Racing as technical team and Spencer Pigot as a driver.

The team was created after a friendship of over 20 years by Robert Citrone, who is a co-founder of Discovery Capital Management and minority owners at the Pittsburgh Steelers, and Robbie Buhl, a former CART and IRL IndyCar Series racing driver, 8-time competitor in the Indy 500, who won the IndyLights in the 1992 season and has won two races in IndyCar in the 1996-1997 season in Pennzoil 200 at the New Hampshire International Speedway for Team Menard and in the 2000 season in the Walt Disney World Speedway race for the Dreyer & Reinbold Racing. In 2016, Robbie, along with his brother Tom Buhl, started Buhl Sport Detroit, a motorsports marketing company, professional race team, and teen driving program based in Detroit, Michigan. Buhl's racing team, Racing4Detroit, ran in the Americas Rallycross Championship in 2018 and 2019, with Alex Keyes as the racing driver.

History

IndyCar
On February 27, 2020, the newly formed team announces its participation in the GMR Grand Prix and the Indy 500 in May, with American Spencer Pigot as driver, champion in the Pro Mazda Championship in the 2014 season and champion in the Indy Lights in 2015 with the Juncos Racing team and former IndyCar driver for Rahal Letterman Lanigan Racing, Ed Carpenter Racing and Juncos Racing and Bobby Rahal's team, Rahal Letterman Lanigan Racing as the technical team. Tom Vigne has joined the team as the chief mechanic of the No. 45 RLL with Citrone/Buhl Autosport entry and Shota Suto will be a mechanic on the car.

Due to the coronavirus pandemic, the rounds set in May were moved to June and August.

Racing results

IndyCar Series
(key)

* Season still in progress

References

External links
  
  
 

American auto racing teams
IndyCar Series teams
Auto racing teams established in 2019
2019 establishments in Michigan